The 2018 U Sports Women's Ice Hockey Championship was held from March 15–18, 2018, in London, Ontario. The entire tournament was played at Thompson Arena on the campus of the University of Western Ontario.

Participating teams

Championship Bracket

Consolation Bracket

Awards and honors
Tournament MVP: Lauryn Keen (Manitoba)

Players of the Game

All-Tournament Team

See also 
 2018 U Sports University Cup

References 

U Sports women's ice hockey
Ice hockey competitions in Ontario
2017–18 in Canadian ice hockey
Sports competitions in London, Ontario
Western Mustangs